Damaskinos Papandreou (born Vasileos Papandreou, Βασίλειος Παπανδρέου; February 23, 1936 in Thermo, Aetolia-Acarnania – November 5, 2011 in Geneva) was the Greek Orthodox metropolitan bishop of Adrianople from 2003 until his death.

Prior to that he was titular metropolitan of Trajanopolis from 1970, elevated to active metropolitan in 1975, and was elected as the first metropolitan of Switzerland in 1982.

References

Bishops of the Ecumenical Patriarchate of Constantinople
1936 births
2011 deaths
Eastern Orthodoxy in Switzerland
Eastern Orthodox bishops in Europe
Swiss bishops
Bishops of Adrianople
People from Aetolia-Acarnania
Corresponding Members of the Academy of Athens (modern)
Theological School of Halki alumni
University of Bonn alumni
University of Marburg alumni
National and Kapodistrian University of Athens alumni